The Kentucky–Tennessee football rivalry is an American college football rivalry between the Kentucky Wildcats and Tennessee Volunteers. The border rivals have faced off on the gridiron since 1893, making it one of the oldest series in major college football. It was close in the early years, with Kentucky holding a series lead after the first 22 match-ups, but since the early 1930s, Tennessee has dominated the cross-border rivalry.

Both schools were charter members of the Southeastern Conference when it was established in 1932. Since that season, Tennessee has a 53–14–3 record against Kentucky, including a streak of 26 straight victories from 1985 to 2010, which is one of the longest such streaks in NCAA history. The Wildcats did not win any games against the Volunteers during the 1940s, 1990s, or 2000s. The only decade of the SEC era in which UK posted a winning record against Tennessee was the 1950s, when they went 6–3–1. The series was not without disappointment even during that period for Kentucky fans, however, as the Vols dealt Bear Bryant's 1950 Wildcat squad its only defeat during its school-best 11–1 season.

The Barrel

History of the trophy
The Kentucky–Tennessee game once involved a trophy: a wooden beer barrel painted half blue and half orange which was awarded to the winner of the game every year from 1925 to 1997.  The Barrel was introduced in 1925 by a group of former Kentucky students who wanted to create a material sign of their school's supremacy in the rivalry. It was rolled onto the field that year with the words "Ice Water" painted on it to avoid any outcries over an alcohol drum symbolizing a college rivalry during the Prohibition era.

While the trophy was ceremonially awarded to the game's winner each year, it took some unauthorized trips over the years. Tennessee lost to Kentucky in 1953, but several orange-clad students "keg-napped" the barrel and kept it hidden in Knoxville until UK students retaliated by "dog-napping" Smokey. The barrel theft set in motion a series of additional pranks over the next few years between students of the two schools, but the barrel was not involved.

Vanderbilt University students stole the keg from Kentucky in 1960 to rally support from cross-state UT students in an upcoming basketball game against Kentucky. The Commodores lost the game and returned the trophy months later.

End of the Barrel era
A fatal alcohol-related car crash involving two UK football players a week before the 1998 contest prompted the end of the barrel exchange. Kentucky athletic director C. M. Newton expressed the idea that the ongoing use of an alcohol container as a trophy would be inappropriate under the circumstances. The ceremony was cancelled for the 1998 game, and the two schools mutually agreed to permanently discontinue the tradition before the 1999 game.

The actual barrel was in UT's possession when the schools ended the exchange, but its current whereabouts have not been made public. It has not been displayed since 1997, and it was not transferred to Kentucky when the Wildcats broke the Volunteers' long series winning streak in 2011.
On November 12, 2019, Tennessee's tight ends coach Brian Niedermeyer posted a photo of the barrel on Twitter.

Game results

Notable games
1950: The Vols handed #3 Kentucky, coached by Bear Bryant, its only loss, 7–0. Tennessee went on and defeated #2 Texas in the Cotton Bowl Classic 20–14 en route to an 11–1 record, and Kentucky defeated #1 Oklahoma 13–7 in the 1951 Sugar Bowl, while also finishing 11-1.

2007: Tennessee came to Lexington looking to clinch the SEC East and a trip to Atlanta after a strong victory over Georgia and after Florida stumbled midway through the season. Kentucky came in with one of its strongest teams in years behind star QB Andre Woodson and a huge upset over then-ranked #1 LSU now looking to end the 22-game losing streak to the Volunteers. The game was a fierce, nail-biting, overtime thriller as Woodson fought to end Kentucky's misery against Tennessee. In the second overtime Tennessee failed to score, giving Kentucky a chance to finally end the streak, but the Cats' field goal attempt was blocked. With the score at 44–44 an unsportsmanlike penalty on UT RB Arian Foster forced Tennessee to start the fourth overtime from the UK 40-yard line, but it was rendered moot as QB Erik Ainge hit WR Quintin Hancock with a touchdown strike on the first play. Tennessee would then make the two-point conversion. On Kentucky's possession RB Derrick Locke scored from three yards out to bring Kentucky within a two-point conversion to keep the game alive. Woodson kept the ball himself on the try, but was stopped from behind short of the goal line for the Volunteer victory. As a result, Tennessee and Georgia finished their seasons with identical 6–2 records to lead the SEC East, but the Vols would move on to the SEC title game by virtue of the head-to-head tiebreaker over the Bulldogs. Tennessee would then lose the following week to the eventual two-loss national champion LSU.  
2008: In the final game for Tennessee's head coach Phillip Fulmer. Fulmer finished his career off with his final victory over the Wildcats, 28–10, leaving Kentucky winless against him.
2009: Tennessee and Kentucky went to overtime once again after another nail-biting game ends tied at 24–24 in regulation. Kentucky relied on star receiver Randall Cobb for most of the game, however Cobb was ineffective on the Wildcats' first possession in overtime only taking one wildcat formation snap. After a three-and-out the ensuing field goal missed wide left. On the Vols' ensuing possession, RB Montario Hardesty broke off a 20-yard run for the game-winning touchdown in Lane Kiffin's lone victory against the Wildcats.
2011: After losing 26 straight games to Tennessee the Wildcats finally notched a 10–7 victory against the Volunteers behind the play of wide receiver Matt Roark who was forced to play under center as both quarterbacks, Maxwell Smith and Morgan Newton, were out with injuries. The loss is often regarded as one of the most embarrassing to Vol fans and one of the many black marks in the Derek Dooley era. Dooley himself took the blame for the loss in an interview with Clay Travis in 2016, saying the team just wasn't ready to perform.
2020: Kentucky ended a 17-game road losing streak in Neyland Stadium with a dominant 34–7 win over the Volunteers. Kentucky's defense had 2 interceptions returned for touchdowns in the game. This was the Wildcats first win in Knoxville since 1984, Kentucky's largest victory over Tennessee in the series since 1935, and the Wildcats' largest victory over the Volunteers in Knoxville since 1924. Mark Stoops became the first Kentucky coach to beat Tennessee in both Lexington and Knoxville since Fran Curci. The loss was one of several that contributed to the downfall of Tennessee coach Jeremy Pruitt, who that following January would be ousted from the program following a NCAA investigation into improper benefits to players.

See also 
 List of NCAA college football rivalry games
 List of most-played college football series in NCAA Division I

References

Kentucky Wildcats football
Tennessee Volunteers football
College football rivalries in the United States